was a radical Japanese anarchist. He published numerous anarchist periodicals, helped translate western anarchist essays into Japanese for the first time, and created Japan's first Esperanto school in 1906. He, his wife, anarcha-feminist Itō Noe, and his nephew were murdered in what became known as the Amakasu incident.

In June 1920 Osugi was contacted by the Korean Yi Ch'un-Suk, who persuaded him to come to Shanghai and meet with Asian Communists involved with the Far Eastern Bureau of the Comintern.

Director Kiju Yoshida made Eros + Massacre (エロス＋虐殺) in 1969, about Ōsugi's life

See also 

 High treason incident
 Amakasu Incident

References

Bibliography

Further reading

External links
 The Anarchist Movement in Japan, a pamphlet by John Crump; includes information on Ōsugi Sakae and Kōtoku Shūsui
 e-texts of Ōsugi Sakae at Aozora Bunko
 Osugi and Bakunin compares Osugi's internationalism with Bakunin's Slavic chauvinism.
 The Legends of Ōsugi Sakae and Noe Ito

1885 births
1923 deaths
Egoist anarchists
Free love advocates
Japanese anarchists
Japanese anti-capitalists
Japanese Esperantists
Japanese socialists
Murdered anarchists
People from Kagawa Prefecture
People of Meiji-period Japan
Meiji socialists